238P/Read (P/2005 U1) is a main-belt comet discovered on 24 October 2005 by astronomer Michael T. Read using the Spacewatch 36-inch telescope on Kitt Peak National Observatory. It has an orbit within the asteroid belt and has displayed the coma of a traditional comet. It fits the definition of an Encke-type comet with (TJupiter > 3; a < aJupiter).

Description 

Before it was discovered  came to perihelion on 2005 July 27. When it was discovered on 2005 October 24, it showed vigorous cometary activity until 2005 December 27. Outgassing likely began at least 2 months before discovery. This may indicate that the impact assumed to have triggered 's activity occurred very recently.

Observations of  when it was inactive in 2007 suggests that it has a small nucleus only about 0.6 km in diameter.

It came to perihelion on 2011 March 10 and 2016 October 22. It will next come to perihelion on 2022 June 5.

 was the target of a mission proposal in NASA's Discovery Program in the 2010s called Proteus, however it was not selected for further development. Discovery program's founding mission was to an asteroid, but it went to a Near-Earth asteroid.  A mission to a main-belt asteroid was proposed in the 1990s (also see Deep Impact (spacecraft)).

See also 
 List of missions to comets

References

External links 
 Orbital simulation from JPL (Java) / Horizons Ephemeris
 Elements and Ephemeris for 238P/Read – Minor Planet Center
 238P/Read at the Minor Planet Center's Database
 Main-Belt Comet 238P/Read Revisited (arXiv:1106.0045 : 31 May 2011)

Active asteroids
Encke-type comets
0238
20051024